Earle is a surname, pronounced 'erl'. Notable people with the surname include:

 Alfred Earle, British air marshal
 Alice Morse Earle
 Beverly M. Earle, American politician
 William Moffat "Billy" Earle, American baseball player
 Bruce Herbelin-Earle, English-French actor and model
 Clifford John Earle Jr. (1935–2017), American mathematician 
 Edward Mead Earle (1894-1954), author, academic and military strategy specialist
 Elias Earle
 Eyvind Earle, American artist
 Franklin Sumner Earle, biologist
 Genevieve Earle (1885-1956), American politician
 George Howard Earle III, American politician
 George Howard Earle Jr. (1856-1928), American lawyer and businessman
 Giles Earle (musician), English collator of songs
 Gordon Earle, Canadian politician
 Guy Earle, English cricketer
 Hobart Earle, Ukrainian conductor
 Horatio Earle, American roads advocate
 John Earle (professor), British scholar of Anglo-Saxon
 Jack Earle, acromegalic American
 Sir James Earle (1755–1817), eighteenth-century British surgeon, renowned for his skill in lithotomy
 John Earle (bishop), English bishop
 John Earle, Australian politician
 John Milton Earle
 Joseph H. Earle
 Josephine Earle (1892–1929), American actress 
 Justin Townes Earle (1982-2020), American singer-songwriter and musician
 Mary Tracy Earle (1864-1955), American author
 Merie Earle (1889–1984), American actress
 Mortimer Lamson Earle (1864–1905), American classical scholar
 Ralph Earle (disambiguation), one of several people
 Robbie Earle, British footballer
 Ronnie Earle, American lawyer and politician
 Stacey Earle, American musician and sister of Steve Earle
 Steve Earle, American musician
 Sylvia Earle, American oceanographer
 Thomas Earle
 William A. Earle (1919–1988), American philosopher
 Wilton R. Earle (1902–1964), American cell biologist
 Windom Earle, fictional character from Twin Peaks

Earle family of New England

Ralph Earle (settler)
Ralph Earle (captain)
Ralph Earl (artist)
Augustus Earle
Ralph Eleaser Whiteside Earl
James Earle (painter)
Pliny Earle I (inventor)
Pliny Earle (physician)
John Milton Earle
Thomas Earle
George Howard Earle Sr.
Florence Van Leer Earle Coates
George Howard Earle Jr.
George Howard Earle III
Ralph Earle II

See also
 Earl (surname)
 Earle (disambiguation)
 Earl
 List of Old English (Anglo-Saxon) surnames